Vilakazi is a surname. Notable people with the surname include:

Benedict Vilakazi (soccer) (born 1982), South African footballer
Benedict Wallet Vilakazi (1906–1947), South African poet, novelist and educator
Herbert Vilakazi (1943–2016), South African sociologist
Nhlanhla Vilakazi (born 1987), South African footballer
Sibusiso Vilakazi (born 1989), South African footballer

Zulu-language surnames